Pál Kinizsi (1432–1494) was a Hungarian general in the service of Hungarian army under king Matthias Corvinus. He was the Count of Temes County (in the historical Banat region, in the Kingdom of Hungary now part of Romania and Serbia after annexation at the Treaty of Trianon which cost Hungary 2/3 of her territory) from 1484 and Captain-General of the Lower Parts. He was a general of King Mathias's famed Black Army. He is famous for his victory over the Ottomans in the Battle of Breadfield in October 1479. He reputedly has never lost a battle.

Life

Origin and early life
Kinizsi's ancestry is obscure. According to some he was a son of a miller, and prior to his military career, he was a journeyman miller. According to some Serbian historians, he was of Serbian origin, and was possibly a descendant of Vuk Branković, though this could not be determined.

The first mention of his name is in 1464, in a Latin written document mentioning that  (His Excellency)  receives a possession in the Abaúj County.

Military career
His central estate was the Castle of Nagyvázsony since 1472 until his death.

After the death of king Matthias in 1490 he supported the Bohemian king Vladislas II of Hungary and the great magnates against Matthias' illegitimate son and designated successor John Corvinus. He destroyed the former king's mercenary Black Army which had become a robber band after its dissolution.
He then was crippled by a stroke and died shortly afterwards. 
He is one of the few generals in history who never lost a battle.

Family
He married Benigna Magyar, the daughter of Blaise Magyar, another general of Corvinus.

Titles
"Count of Temes"
"Captain General of the Lower Parts of the Kingdom of Hungary"

Folklore
In legends, he is known as a commoner. Kinizsi is a hero of some Hungarian and Romanian folk tales along with king Matthias Corvinus as an extremely strong former miller's apprentice. According to these tales, the king was hunting in the Bakony forest near the mill where he worked and asked for a drink; Kinizsi, to show his strength, served the cup on a millstone. The king, impressed, took him into his service, where Kinizsi's strength, prowess and loyalty earned him rapid promotion. He is said to have wielded two greatswords in battle and to have danced a victory dance after the Battle of Kenyérmező with a captured or dead Turk under each arm and a third held with his hair or belt in his teeth.

Honors
Chinezul Timișoara was a football club, which played both in the Romanian and the Hungarian championship during its existence. It was based in Timișoara, Romania (at the time of foundation Temesvár, Austria-Hungary).

Postage stamps: Pál Kinizsi postage stamps were issued by Hungary on 1 January 1943 and in 1945. This same stamp was surcharged 28 fillér on 5 fillér and issued in 1945.

References

Sources

1432 births
1494 deaths
15th-century Hungarian people
Hungarian generals
Hungarian people of Serbian descent
Judges royal